Toby Stephen Gee (born 2 January 1980) is a British mathematician working in number theory and arithmetic aspects of the Langlands Program.  He specialises in algebraic number theory.

Gee was awarded the Whitehead Prize in 2012, the Leverhulme Prize in 2012, and was elected as a Fellow of the American Mathematical Society in 2014.

Career 
Gee read mathematics at Trinity College, Cambridge, where he was Senior Wrangler in 2000. After completing his PhD with Kevin Buzzard at Imperial College in 2004, he was a Benjamin Peirce Assistant Professor at Harvard University until 2010. From 2010 to 2011 Gee was an assistant professor at Northwestern University, at which point he moved to Imperial College London, where he has been a professor since 2013.

With Mark Kisin, he proved the Breuil–Mézard conjecture for potentially Barsotti–Tate representations, and with Thomas Barnet-Lamb and David Geraghty, he proved the Sato–Tate conjecture for Hilbert modular forms. One of his most influential ideas has been the introduction of a general 'philosophy of weights', which has immensely clarified some aspects of the emerging mod p Langlands philosophy.

References

External links 
 Toby Gee's Professional Webpage
 Toby Gee's Curriculum Vitae
 

1980 births
British mathematicians
Alumni of Trinity College, Cambridge
Whitehead Prize winners
Fellows of the American Mathematical Society
Living people